Synne Skinnes Hansen (born 12 August 1995) is a Norwegian football midfielder, who has played for the Norway women's national football team since 2016 and for Linköping since 2020.

Club career
Until 2012 she played for Eik-Tønsberg. Skinnes Hansen played in the top series for the Norway first division team Røa IL, who had won Toppserien the year before, starting in 2012. The title could not be defended and Røa was only fourth. In the following years, Røa commuted between 3rd and 8th place. She also played for Røa for the first time in the 2012–13 UEFA Women's Champions League, where Røa was eliminated against the later winner VfL Wolfsburg in the round of 16 after a 4–1 away defeat and a 1–1 home win. After five years with Røa, in 2017, she moved to new champions, Lillestrøm SK Kvinner. With Lillestrøm she won the Norwegian Championship in 2017 and 2018 and the Norwegian Football Cup in 2018. She played for Lillestrøm in the 2017–18 UEFA Women's Champions League, where Lillestrøm lost twice to Manchester City W.F.C. in the round of 16. In the 2018–19 UEFA Women's Champions League FC Barcelona Femení were stronger in the quarter-finals. She scored her first CL goal in the Round of 16 in a 2–0 away win over Brøndby IF.

Career statistics

International career
Skinnes Hansen was part of Norway junior teams and took part in the 2013 UEFA Women's Under-19 Championship in Wales in August, but Norway was eliminated in the group stage. A year later, she and her team reached the semi-finals of the 2014 UEFA Women's Under-19 Championship in their home country, but lost 2–0 to Spain. Her time in the U-19 ended with eight matches with the U-23 team.

On 15 September 2016, she was substituted for captain Maren Mjelde in the 10–0 UEFA Women's Euro 2017 qualifying match against Kazakhstan for her first A international at 7–0 in the 68th minute. She had to wait a year for her next match. She was therefore not nominated for the European Championship 2017, when Norway was eliminated for the first time without scoring a goal.  Also in the following games she was only substituted and also played again for the U-23. On 8 June 2018 she was then in the qualification game against Ireland for the first time in the starting eleven and was allowed to play 90 minutes. In 2019, she was in the starting eleven in all games until the nomination of the World Cup squad, but was almost always replaced, and achieved her first tournament success in the Algarve Cup 2019. On 2 May, she was nominated for the 2019 World Cup.

References

External links
 

1995 births
2019 FIFA Women's World Cup players
Living people
Eik-Tønsberg players
LSK Kvinner FK players
Norwegian women's footballers
Norway women's international footballers
People from Buskerud
Røa IL players
Toppserien players
Women's association football midfielders
Sportspeople from Viken (county)
UEFA Women's Euro 2022 players